Ladislav Kudrna (born January 10, 1977) is a Czech former professional ice hockey goaltender.

Kudrna played in the Czech Extraliga for HC Slavia Praha, HC Dukla Jihlava and Hc Znojemští Orli. He also played in the Elite Ice Hockey League for the Nottingham Panthers, London Racers, Newcastle Vipers, Hull Stingrays and the Dundee Stars, and in the British National League for the Edinburgh Capitals and Hull Stingrays prior to the existence of the EIHL.

References

External links

1977 births
Living people
HC Berounští Medvědi players
Czech ice hockey goaltenders
Drakkars de Caen players
HC Dukla Jihlava players
Dundee Stars players
Edinburgh Capitals players
BK Havlíčkův Brod players
Stadion Hradec Králové players
Hull Stingrays players
HC Kometa Brno players
London Racers players
Newcastle Vipers players
Nottingham Panthers players
Orli Znojmo players
HC Slavia Praha players
HC Slovan Ústečtí Lvi players
Swindon Wildcats players
Expatriate ice hockey players in England
Czech expatriate ice hockey players in Russia
Expatriate ice hockey players in Scotland
Expatriate ice hockey players in France
Czech expatriate sportspeople in England
Czech expatriate sportspeople in Scotland
Czech expatriate sportspeople in France